Félix Paiva (21 February 1877, Caazapá, Caazapá Department – 2 November 1965, Asunción) was a Paraguayan politician from the Liberal Party.

He studied law and worked as university teacher, rector of the University and president of the Supreme Court. In his political career he was a minister in many occasions, Vice President of Paraguay 1920–1921, and also President of Paraguay from 15 August 1937 to 15 August 1939.

He became president after the overthrow of Rafael Franco. In his term he restored the political constitution of 1870. On 10 October 1938, the Congress of Paraguay confirmed Paiva as provisional president. He signed a peace agreement with Bolivia in 1938, which concluded the Chaco War.

References

1877 births
1965 deaths
20th-century Paraguayan lawyers
People from Caazapá
Liberal Party (Paraguay) politicians
Presidents of Paraguay
Vice presidents of Paraguay
Presidents of the Senate of Paraguay
Universidad Nacional de Asunción alumni
Paraguayan judges